Evernia mesomorpha is a species of lichen belonging to the family Parmeliaceae.

It has a cosmopolitan distribution.

References

Parmeliaceae
Lichen species
Taxa named by William Nylander (botanist)
Lichens described in 1861